Christopher Allen Jefferies (born February 13, 1980) is an American former professional basketball player. He played for the Toronto Raptors and the Chicago Bulls in the National Basketball Association (NBA). He played college basketball for the Arkansas Razorbacks and Fresno State Bulldogs.

College career
Jeffries was named First Team All-Western Athletic Conference, All-Defensive Team and All-Newcomer Team as a sophomore at Fresno State University. Also named WAC Newcomer of the Year by the conference media.  Jefferies had transferred from the Arkansas following his freshman year.

Professional career
Selected in the first round (27th overall pick) of the 2002 NBA Draft out of Fresno State by the Los Angeles Lakers, his draft rights were traded along with Lindsey Hunter to the Toronto Raptors for Tracy Murray and the draft rights to Kareem Rush. He was later traded to the Chicago Bulls during the 2003-04 season.

Jefferies' final NBA game was played on April 14, 2004 in a 96 - 101 loss to the Indiana Pacers where he recorded 2 points and 5 fouls as the Bulls' starting Small Forward. In his short NBA career, Jefferies registered 72 games played, 12 game starts, and averaged 3.9 points and 1.2 rebounds per game. He is also the half-brother to Nate Jefferies, Immanuel High School basketball star.

External links
College & NBA stats - Basketballreference.com
NBA.com - Player Bio

1980 births
Living people
African-American basketball players
American expatriate basketball people in Canada
American men's basketball players
Arkansas Razorbacks men's basketball players
Basketball players from California
Chicago Bulls players
Fresno State Bulldogs men's basketball players
Los Angeles Lakers draft picks
Shooting guards
Small forwards
Sportspeople from Fresno, California
Toronto Raptors players
21st-century African-American sportspeople
20th-century African-American people